Kung Fu Fighter is a 2007 Hong Kong Kung Fu movie directed by Wing Kin Yip and Yongjian Ye.

Plot summary 
Ma Vanness Wu a young man travels to looks for his father in Shanghai hoping to learn the Kung Fu from him and later in that process he discover having an hidden super human strength and abilities, he use the power against the Shanghai gangsters and their group of ruthless warriors.

Cast

 Vanness Wu Chien-Hao as Manik
 Fan Siu-Wong	as Sam Long
 Bruce Leung Siu-Lung	as Uncle Yeah
 Lam Tze-Chung	 as Porky
 Danny Chan Kwok-Kwan as Don Ching
 Emme Wong Yi-Man as Goldie
 Tenky Tin Kai-Man as Sam Cho
 Chan Sek	as Rocky
 Mo Mei-Lin	 as Doctor
 Chen Yong-Xia	as Auntie Lan
 Kit Cheung Man-Kit	 as Wu Long
 John Zhang Jin as Xi Long
 Fan Man-Kit as Da Fay
 Li Hui	as Rainbow
 Wang Jian-Jun as Wizard
 Chen Ting-Hui as Siu Fay
 Liu Ai-Ju as Ling
 Ni Yu-Cheng	 as Seer
 Karen Cheung Bo-Man as Miko
 Yang Yi-Fan as Iron Head
 Zhao Shuai as Wingo
 Ruan Li-Ming	as Caron
 Li Wan-Ting as Cat Girl
 Chun Yu Shan Shan	 as Willow

References

External links 

 
 Hong Kong Movie Database
 
 KUNG FU FIGHTER (2007-HK/CHINA)
 Kung Fu Fighter- The Movie Database, via; the movie.org

Live-action films based on manga
Hong Kong martial arts comedy films
Martial arts fantasy films
Martial arts science fiction films
Hong Kong fantasy adventure films
2000s Mandarin-language films
2007 martial arts films
2000s adventure films
2007 films
2007 science fiction novels
2007 fantasy films
Kung fu films
2000s Hong Kong films